Aksyutinskaya is a rural locality (a village) in Verkhovskoye Rural Settlement, Tarnogsky District, Vologda Oblast, Russia. The population was 13 as of 2002.

Geography 
Aksyutinskaya is located 39 km west of Tarnogsky Gorodok (the district's administrative centre) by road. Makarovskaya is the nearest rural locality.

References 

Rural localities in Tarnogsky District